Marshall Diel & Myers Ltd. is a litigation-focused law firm based in Hamilton, Bermuda.

History 

Marshall & Company was founded in 1989, with the partnership expanded in 2000 as "Marshall Aicardi". Diel & Myers was formed in 1998. In 2002, the two firms merged into Marshall Diel & Myers. The founding partners were Timothy Marshall, Georgia Marshall, Luciano Aicardi, Mark Diel, and Ronald Myers.

From 2008 to 2010, the firm had a co-operative agreement with Edwards Angell Palmer & Dodge.

On September 2, 2011, it was announced that MD&M's corporate services company, Charter Corporate Services Ltd., and trust company, Paragon Trust Ltd. were being acquired by Bermuda Commercial Bank. In January 2012, the firm converted to a limited liability company, focused on litigation.

Practice Areas 
The firm has a number of practice areas including:

 Matrimonial and family law
 International business, including insurance and reinsurance and incorporation of offshore companies
 Media and telecommunications
 Litigation
 Real estate
 Immigration

Prior to the sale of its trust company, it also specialized in trusts and estate planning

Competitors 
 Appleby Spurling Hunter
 Conyers Dill & Pearman

See also 

 Law of Bermuda

References

External links 
Official website
Bermuda Government (Dept. Civil Aviation) List of Bermuda law firms

Offshore law firms
Law firms established in 2002
2002 establishments in Bermuda